Katarina Mary Johnson-Thompson (born 9 January 1993) is an English athlete. A multi-eventer, she is primarily known as both a heptathlete and an indoor pentathlete. She has been World Champion in both, as well as a double Commonwealth Games heptathlon champion.

Representing Great Britain, Johnson-Thompson won the gold medal at the 2019 World Championships and broke the British record with a score of 6,981 points, which ranks her at No. 6 on the all-time heptathlon lists. She also holds the British record indoors of 5,000 points for the women's pentathlon and won gold in that event at the 2018 World Indoor Championships, as well as the 2015 and 2019 European Indoor Championships.

Johnson-Thompson has also occasionally represented Great Britain in her two strongest multi-event disciplines: the individual high jump and long jump. She holds the British high jump records with 1.98 m outdoors (2016) and 1.97 m indoors (2015), and in the long jump, she was the 2012 World Junior Champion and the 2014 World Indoor silver medalist. Her heptathlon results include finishing 14th at the 2012 London Olympics, fifth at the 2013 World Championships, sixth at the 2016 Rio Olympics, and fifth at the 2017 World Championships. She won the gold medal in the heptathlon at the 2018 Commonwealth Games before winning the silver medal at the 2018 European Championships with a personal best score of 6,759 points, which moved her into the world all-time Top 25. She retained her heptathlon gold medal at the 2022 Commonwealth Games while recovering from Achilles tendon surgery.

Johnson-Thompson's career has often coincided with those of fellow British athlete Jessica Ennis-Hill and Nafi Thiam, with whom she has competed since junior competition. She is the only athlete to have defeated Thiam in global competition since Thiam won Olympic gold in 2016, and is one of only four heptathletes in this millennium (alongside Ennis-Hill, Thiam, and Sweden's Carolina Kluft) to exceed 6,900 points, as well as one of only five pentathletes of all time to breach 5,000 points (alongside Thiam, Poland's Adrianna Sułek, Ukraine's Nataliya Dobrynska, and USA's Anna Hall).

Early life
Katarina Mary Johnson-Thompson was born in the Woolton suburb of Liverpool on 9 January 1993, the daughter of English mother Tracey Johnson and Bahamian father Ricardo Thompson (died November 2017). Her mother is a former dancer, while her father worked as a production assistant for the Bahamian television station ZNS-TV. She spent the first year of her life in Nassau with her father after her parents separated, then returned to England to live with her mother in the town of Halewood near Liverpool, where she attended St Mark's Catholic Primary School and became interested in athletics. She later moved with her mother back to Woolton, where she attended St Julie's Catholic High School and became close friends with future actress Jodie Comer, before going on to study sports science at Liverpool John Moores University.

Career

Youth career
Johnson-Thompson represents Liverpool Harriers, which is based in Liverpool's Wavertree district, and was formerly coached by Mike Holmes. Her development was in part funded by the Wells Sports Foundation set up by Barrie Wells, which gave her access to the foundation's patron, Jessica Ennis (now Dame Jessica Ennis-Hill).

At the 2009 World Youth Championships in Athletics in Brixen, Italy, she won the gold medal in the heptathlon. She missed most of the 2010 athletics season suffering from patellar tendinopathy, also known as jumper's knee.

Johnson-Thompson broke Jessica Ennis' British junior record at the Multistars competition held in Desenzano del Garda, Italy in May 2012. Her score of 6007 points was enough to take third position at the event behind Sofía Ifadídou of Greece and French athlete Blandine Maisonnier. The score also meant she had surpassed the 'B' qualifying standard for the 2012 Olympics, however it fell short of the 6,150 points 'A' standard. In June 2012, Johnson-Thompson achieved the 'A' qualifying standard for the 2012 Olympics by scoring a new personal best of 6,248 points at the TNT – Fortuna Meeting held in the Sletiště Stadium, Kladno, Czech Republic. At the meeting she set six new personal bests across the seven events to beat her previous best score by 241 points.

At the 2012 World Junior Championships in Athletics held in Barcelona, Johnson-Thompson chose not to compete in the full heptathlon competition to save herself for the Olympics; instead she took part in the long jump—winning a gold medal with a jump of 6.81 metres—and the 100 metres hurdles.

In early April 2012, alongside Tiffany Porter and Yamilé Aldama, she was nominated for "European Athlete of the Month" for March.

London Olympics and first World Championships
Johnson-Thompson competed for Great Britain at the 2012 Summer Olympics in the women's heptathlon alongside compatriots Jessica Ennis and Louise Hazel at the Olympic Stadium on 3–4 August 2012. She finished in 13th place with a score of 6267.

In September, Johnson-Thompson was nominated for the "European Athletics Rising Star award". In October, she won the "Lillian Board Memorial Award" (for junior women) at the 2012 British Athletics Writers' Association Awards.

In the 2013 IAAF World Championships heptathlon, Johnson-Thompson finished in 5th place. After a first day which left her in 5th place, with a PB in the 200 m, she had an excellent second day with PB's in the long jump, javelin and the 800 m. However, she admitted afterwards that she wished she had set her target of finishing in the Top 8 with more ambition, having finished just 28 points away from bronze medallist Dafne Schippers.

First World Indoor and European medals
On 11 July 2014, Johnson-Thompson set a new long jump personal best of 6.92 m at the Glasgow Diamond League meeting, taking her to number 2 on the British all-time list for the event. She won gold at the 2014 edition of the prestigious heptathlon Hypo-Meeting in Götzis with a world leading personal best score of 6682 but missed the Glasgow Commonwealth Games and the European Championships after suffering a foot injury.

Johnson-Thompson set a new British high jump record with a height of 1.97 metres at the British Indoor Championships in Sheffield on 14 February 2015, surpassing her previous record of 1.96 metres set on 8 February 2014. Prior to Johnson-Thompson, Debbie Marti's 1.95-metre jump had held the record since 1997.

On 21 February 2015, she set a new British indoor long jump record with a distance of 6.93 m at the Birmingham Indoor Grand Prix.

In August 2015, Johnson-Thompson finished in 28th place in the heptathlon at the 2015 World Championships in Beijing after three foul jumps in the long jump. She had been lying in second place to Jessica Ennis-Hill after the first day of events.

Johnson-Thompson competed at the 2016 Hypo-Meeting in May of that year, her first major competition since undergoing knee surgery in the autumn of 2015: she finished the competition in sixth with a score of 6,304 points, securing her place at the 2016 Rio Olympics by beating the qualifying standard of 6,200 points.

She missed out on a medal at the Games, taking sixth in the heptathlon, although her performance in the heptathlon high jump of 1.98 m set a new British high jump record, and would have been good enough to take gold in the stand-alone Olympic high jump competition.

In September 2016, UK Athletics confirmed that Johnson-Thompson had split with coach Mike Holmes, having been trained by him since 2008.

She subsequently moved to Montpellier, France, to be coached by a team led by Bertrand Valcin, joining a training group including Olympic decathlon medalist Kevin Mayer and double European heptathlon champion Antoinette Nana Djimou.

On 5–6 August 2017, Johnson-Thompson competed in the heptathlon at the 2017 World Championships in Athletics held in London. After moving to Montpellier, she was expected to land a podium position but was not able to surpass the 1.86 barrier in the heptathlon's high jump, with a successful jump at 1.80 m, which gave her 978 points. In a post heptathlon Day 1 interview, she stated: "High jump is one of my best events, I lost 200 points in just one event so that's massive. I'm massively disappointed but I'm trying to move on. In Day 2, long jump is one of my good events so hopefully I can do well there". Johnson-Thompson finished in 5th place with 6558 points. She also competed in the single high jump event, finishing fifth with a season's best jump at 1.95 m.

World and Commonwealth titles
In 2018, Johnson-Thompson won the World indoor pentathlon and the Commonwealth Games heptathlon titles, before going on to win a silver medal behind World and Olympic champion Nafi Thiam in the heptathlon at the European Championships, recording a personal best score of 6759 points, to move into the world all-time Top 25.

In May 2019, at the 45th Hypomeeting in Götzis, Johnson-Thompson recorded a new personal best of 6,813 in the heptathlon, taking her up to 18th on the world all-time list.

She won the heptathlon at the 2019 World Athletics Championships in Doha, Qatar with a British record of 6981 points.

Johnson-Thompson won the heptathlon at the 2022 Commonwealth Games in Birmingham, England.

Personal life
Since 2016, Johnson-Thompson has divided her time between her native Liverpool and the French city of Montpellier. She began dating fellow athlete Andrew Pozzi in 2018. She is a lifelong fan of her hometown football team Liverpool FC.

Statistics

Personal bests
Outdoor personal bests

Indoor personal bests

All information from Power of 10.

Seasonal bests

International competitions

Detailed heptathlon scores

National titles
British Athletics Championships
Long jump: 2014
British Indoor Athletics Championships
Long jump: 2014, 2018, 2019
High jump: 2014, 2015

See also
List of World Athletics Championships medalists (women)
List of IAAF World Indoor Championships medalists (women)
List of Commonwealth Games medallists in athletics (women)
List of European Athletics Championships medalists (women)
List of European Athletics Indoor Championships medalists (women)
Great Britain and Northern Ireland at the World Athletics Championships
List of Commonwealth records in athletics
List of English records in athletics
List of people from Merseyside

References

External links

 
 
 
 
 
 

1993 births
Living people
Sportspeople from Liverpool
British heptathletes
English heptathletes
British female long jumpers
British female high jumpers
English female long jumpers
English female high jumpers
Olympic heptathletes
Olympic athletes of Great Britain
Athletes (track and field) at the 2012 Summer Olympics
Athletes (track and field) at the 2016 Summer Olympics
Commonwealth Games gold medallists for England
Commonwealth Games gold medallists in athletics
Athletes (track and field) at the 2018 Commonwealth Games
World Athletics Championships athletes for Great Britain
World Athletics Championships winners
World Athletics Championships medalists
World Athletics Indoor Championships winners
World Youth Championships in Athletics winners
European Athletics Indoor Championships winners
British Athletics Championships winners
British people of Bahamian descent
Alumni of Liverpool John Moores University
Commonwealth Games competitors for England
Athletes (track and field) at the 2020 Summer Olympics
Athletes (track and field) at the 2022 Commonwealth Games
Medallists at the 2018 Commonwealth Games
Medallists at the 2022 Commonwealth Games